Banksia nobilis subsp. nobilis is a subspecies of Banksia nobilis (golden dryandra). As an autonym, it is defined as encompassing the type material of the species. It was known as Dryandra nobilis subsp. nobilis until 2007, when Austin Mast and Kevin Thiele transferred Dryandra into Banksia. As with other members of Banksia ser. Dryandra, it is endemic to the South West Botanical Province of Western Australia.

References

Further reading
 
 
 
 

nobilis subsp. nobilis
Plant subspecies